The 2022–23 QMJHL season season is the 54th season of the Quebec Major Junior Hockey League (QMJHL). The regular season began on September 22, 2022, and is scheduled to end on March 25, 2023. The playoffs are scheduled to begin in March 2023. QMJHL commissioner Gilles Courteau, resigned as of March 5, 2023, succeeded by Martin Lavallée as the interim commissioner.

The winning team will be awarded the President's Cup and will earn a berth in the 2023 Memorial Cup which is set to be hosted by the Kamloops Blazers of the Western Hockey League at the Sandman Centre in Kamloops, British Columbia.

Regular season standings
As of March 17, 2023

Note: GP = Games played; W = Wins; L = Losses; OTL = Overtime losses; SL = Shootout losses; GF = Goals for; GA = Goals against; PTS = Points; x = clinched playoff berth; y = clinched division title; z = clinched Jean Rougeau Trophy

Eastern Conference

Western Conference

Scoring leaders
Note: GP = Games played; G = Goals; A = Assists; Pts = Points; PIM = Penalty minutes
Source: TheQMJHL.ca

Leading goaltenders
Note: GP = Games played; Mins = Minutes played; W = Wins; L = Losses: OTL = Overtime losses; SL = Shootout losses; GA = Goals Allowed; SO = Shutouts; GAA = Goals against average
Source: TheQMJHL.ca

2023 Gilles-Courteau Trophy playoffs 
In the first two rounds seeding is determined by conference standings, and in the two final rounds seeding is determined by overall standings.

Trophies and awards
President's Cup – Playoff Champions: 
Jean Rougeau Trophy – Regular Season Champions: 
Luc Robitaille Trophy – Team with the best goals for average: 
Robert Lebel Trophy – Team with best GAA:

Player
Michel Brière Memorial Trophy – Most Valuable Player: 
Jean Béliveau Trophy – Top Scorer: 
Guy Lafleur Trophy – Playoff MVP: 
Jacques Plante Memorial Trophy – Top Goaltender: 
Guy Carbonneau Trophy – Best Defensive Forward: 
Emile Bouchard Trophy – Defenceman of the Year: 
Kevin Lowe Trophy – Best Defensive Defenceman:
Michael Bossy Trophy – Top Prospect: 
RDS Cup – Rookie of the Year:
Michel Bergeron Trophy – Offensive Rookie of the Year: 
Raymond Lagacé Trophy – Defensive Rookie of the Year: 
Frank J. Selke Memorial Trophy – Most sportsmanlike player: 
QMJHL Humanitarian of the Year – Humanitarian of the Year: 
Marcel Robert Trophy – Best Scholastic Player: 
Paul Dumont Trophy – Personality of the Year:

Executive
Ron Lapointe Trophy – Coach of the Year: 
Maurice Filion Trophy – General Manager of the Year:

See also
 List of QMJHL seasons
 2022–23 OHL season
 2022–23 WHL season

References

External links
 Official QMJHL website
 Official CHL website

Quebec Major Junior Hockey League seasons
QMJHL